Innfjorden is a village in Rauma Municipality in Møre og Romsdal county, Norway.

The local economy is mainly based on agriculture, while there is some industry and a few service companies relating to tourism, transportation, and road safety. In addition there is an elementary school, kindergarten, and the small Innfjorden Chapel.

The area is frequented by mountain hikers and lately a lot of BASE jumpers have discovered the mountains around Innfjorden.

References

Rauma, Norway
Villages in Møre og Romsdal